Without My Daughter (2002, Finland) is a 90-minute documentary directed by Kari Tervo and Alexis Kouros.

In 1987, Not Without My Daughter was published, based on the story of an American woman, Betty Mahmoody. According to the book, Mahmoody and her daughter, Mahtob, were taken by her Iranian husband, Sayyed Bozorg Mahmoody, for a "two-week holiday" to Iran, and he kept them there against their will. She managed to escape 18 months later over the mountains into Turkey, taking their 5-year-old daughter with her back to the United States. In 1991, Not Without My Daughter, a film starring Sally Field and Alfred Molina, was released, based on the events described in her book.

Without My Daughter, directed by Iranian-Finnish Alexis Kouros, relates Sayyed Mahmoody's account, purportedly to explore the wider political and global contexts underlying the case of the Mahmoody family.

Festival screenings
International Documentary Festival Amsterdam IDGA, Joris Ivens series 2002
Docpoint International Documentary festival, Helsinki, Finland 2003
Gothenburg Film Festival, Gothenburg, Sweden 2003
Fajr Film Festival, Tehran, Iran 2003
Tampere International Film Festival, Tampere, Finland 2003
VERA, Short and Documentary Film Festival, Mariehamn, Finland 2003
East Lansing International Film Festival, Michigan, USA 2003
Jeon Ju International Film Festival, Seoul, Korea 2003

References

External links

"Finnish Documentary Counters Anti-Iran Propaganda in US Film"

Finnish documentary films
Documentary films about Iran
2002 films
2002 documentary films
Films scored by Tuomas Kantelinen